Dragpipe was a heavy metal band from Union City, New Jersey. The band was known for their energetic live performances and developed a local following in North Jersey and across the Hudson River in New York City. In 2001, the band was signed to Interscope Records after successfully demoing their songs for Twiggy Ramirez and Jason Newsted. That same year, alongside other New York City area bands such as Biohazard and Glassjaw, as well as Sacramento band Will Haven, Dragpipe submitted contributions to Driven State - A Quicksand Tribute, a proposed tribute album for the influential New York post-hardcore band Quicksand.

In August 2002, Dragpipe released their debut (and only) album, Music for the Last Day of Your Life, produced by Dave Sardy (Helmet, Rage Against the Machine, Nine Inch Nails). Following the album's debut, the band produced and released a music video featuring adult actress Kitana Baker for their song "Simple Minded." That same year, the band embarked on an East Coast tour and a European tour with Filter. The album sold poorly (30,000 copies as of 2009) and the band was released from their record contract soon after the debut release, and they apparently disbanded.

Members
 Jai Diablo (real name Jason Messina) - Vocals
 Richie Garcia – Guitar
 Gino DePinto – Guitar
 John Monte – Guitar
 Jeno (real name Michael Genovezos) – Bass
 Pete Barrera – Drums

Studio albums

Further reading

http://www.metal-rules.com/interviews/dragpipe.htm

References

American alternative metal musical groups
Heavy metal musical groups from New Jersey
American stoner rock musical groups
American nu metal musical groups